Sperrin is a surname. Notable people with the surname include:

 Billy Sperrin (1922–2000), English footballer and coach
 Martyn Sperrin (born 1956), English footballer, son of Billy

See also
 Sperrins